Carajás was the name for a proposed new Brazilian state, which would consist of the southeast part of the current state of Pará. Along with a simultaneous proposal to create another state called Tapajós from another part of Pará, the proposal was defeated in a referendum in 2011 and by law could not be revived until 2015; as of 2018, no new such proposal has been made. Although voters within the territory of the proposed new states voted strongly in favor, the vote was strongly negative among the much larger population in what would have remained of Pará.

Municipalities
The new state's largest city and proposed capital would be Marabá. As of 2011, its GDP of BRL 19.5 billion constituted 33% of the total GDP of Pará.

The two most populous municipalities would be Marabá (population 233,462) and Parauapebas (population 153,942).

List of municipalities in the proposed state

2011 referendum

In a referendum held on December 11, 2011, the residents of the entire state of Pará were asked to vote on proposals to split the state into three new states: Carajás in the southeast, Tapajós in the west, and a rump Pará in the northeast. Voting was highly polarized regionally, with voters in the territories of the proposed new states voting strongly in favor, while voters in the rump Pará voted strongly against. In particular, more than 90% of voters in Marabá voted in favor, while more than 90% of voters in Pará's capital city of Belém voted against. As Belém and its surrounding area comprise over half the population of the original state, the proposal had no chance of passing.

References

External links

See also

 Tapajós - the other proposed state to be carved out of Pará, with the proposal also defeated in the December 2011 referendum

Pará
Proposed states and territories of Brazil